Kirkton ("church town") may refer to:

Places

Canada
Kirkton, Ontario, a community within South Huron, Huron County, Ontario
Kirkton, Perth County, Ontario, a community within Perth South, Perth County, Ontario

Scotland
Kirkton, Dumfries and Galloway, a village
Kirkton, Dundee, a residential area
Kirkton, Livingston, an area of Livingston
Kirkton, Scottish Borders, a village
Kirkton of Auchterhouse, in Auchterhouse, Angus
Kirkton of Auchterless, commonly known as Auchterless, Aberdeenshire
Kirkton of Durris, in Durris, Aberdeenshire
Kirkton of Glenisla, in Glen Isla, Angus
Kirkton of Kingoldrum, in Angus
Kirkton of Largo, an alternative name of Upper Largo, Fife
Kirkton of Maryculter, commonly known as Maryculter, Aberdeenshire
Kirkton of Skene, in Skene, Aberdeenshire
Kirkton of Strathmartine, previous name of Bridgefoot, a village in Angus
Kirkton of Tough, in the Marr area of Aberdeenshire

People with the surname
 James Kirkton (1628–1699), Church of Scotland minister and author
 Jeanne Kirkton (born 1953), American politician

See also
Kirkton of Bourtie stone circle
Kirktown (disambiguation)
Churchtown (disambiguation)